Return to Zero is the debut album of the band RTZ.  It was released in 1991 by Giant Records.

Track listing
All songs written by Delp and Goudreau, except where noted.
 "Face the Music" (Goudreau, Maes) - 4:01
 "There's Another Side" - 4:11
 "All You've Got" - 4:02
 "This Is My Life" - 5:33
 "Rain Down on Me" (Goudreau, John Warren, Maes, Stefanelli, Archibald) - 4:15
 "Every Door Is Open" - 4:27
 "Devil to Pay" - 4:30
 "Until Your Love Comes Back Around" (Maes) - 5:56
 "Livin' for the Rock 'N' Roll" - 3:27
 "Hard Time (In the Big House)" - 4:06
 "Return to Zero" (Delp, Goudreau, Maes) - 3:25

Singles
"Face the Music"
"All You've Got"
"Until Your Love Comes Back Around"

Personnel

Band members
 Brad Delp - lead and background vocals
 Barry Goudreau - guitar, background vocals
 Brian Maes - keyboards, harmonica, tambourine, background vocals
 Tim Archibald - bass
 David Stefanelli - drums, background vocals

Guest musicians
 Bob Gay - sax solo on Track 9
 Maxine Waters - background vocals on Track 7
 Julia Waters - background vocals on Track 7

Horns on Track 7
 Jerry Hey - trumpet
 Jay Cable - trumpet
 Bill Reichenbach Jr. - trombone
 Dan Higgins - sax
 Bill Liston - sax

Producing and recording
 Produced and Engineered and Mixed by Chris Lord-Alge
 Recorded at Studios Image Recording (Hollywood, California), Rumbo Recorders (Canoga Park, California), Village Recorders (Santa Monica, California), Blue Jay (Carlisle, MA)
 Assistant Engineers: Talley Sherwood, Jason Roberts, Rob Hart & Andy Udoff
 Assistant Engineer at Blue Jay Studios: Mark Tanzer
 Mastered By Bob Ludwig

Notes 

1991 debut albums
Albums produced by Chris Lord-Alge
Giant Records (Warner) albums